14 Phere is a 2021 Indian Hindi-language social comedy film directed by Devanshu Singh and produced by Zee Studios. The film stars Vikrant Massey and Kriti Kharbanda. It premiered on 23 July 2021 on ZEE5.

Plot

Sanjay Lal Singh and Aditi Karwasra, two individuals belonging to different castes, fall in love and wish to get married. However, knowing their parents will disapprove, they hatch a plan to convince them.

Cast

 Vikrant Massey as Sanjay Lal Singh a.k.a. Sanju
 Kriti Kharbanda as Aditi Karwasra
 Gauahar Khan as Zubina
 Jameel Khan as Amay
 Yamini Das as Sarla Lal Singh
 Vineet Kumar as Kanhaiya Lal Singh
 Priyanshu Singh as Chhotu Singh
 Manoj Bakshi as Banwari Mama
 Govind Pandey as Dharampal Karwasra
 Sumit Suri as Vivek Karwasra
 Sonakshi Batra as Sneha Karwasra
 Bhupesh Singh as Jayant Mishra
 Kritika Pande as Rashmi
 Geet Sagar as Anuj Mathur (Aditi and Sanjay's Boss)
 Shivani Shivpuri as Mrs Gupta

Production 
Principal photography commenced on 26 November 2020 in Mumbai, and was wrapped up in January 2021.

Reception 
Shubhra Gupta of The Indian Express gave the film 1.5 out of 5 stars and stated, "Between the long-drawn, wholly preposterous idea of fake ‘baraatis’, and two ‘shaadis’, there's just confusion in this Vikrant Massey-Kriti Kharbanda film." Saibal Chatterjee of NDTV gave the film 1.5 out of 5 stars and stated, "Notwithstanding the serviceable chemistry between the lead actors and a few performances from the supporting cast, the film goes around in circles." Rahul Desai of Film Companion gave the film a negative review and stated that the film "loses its spirit and identity" and is "half-funny, half-serious And fully confused". Stutee Ghosh of The Quint gave the film a mixed review and stated, "Given that the humour is pretty flat, the narrative would have benefited with some intense emotional moments and by showing some spine and vision. It almost feels like the message is that as long as one can show off an ostentatious display of wealth and dowry, one can hush up about caste- a rather problematic resolution!" Anita Aikara of Rediff.com gave the film 2.5 out of 5 stars and stated, "14 Phere delivers on the feel-good factor, but if you are looking for ground-breaking humour, it will fail to work its way into your hearts." Nandini Ramnath of Scroll gave the film a negative review and criticized the screenplay, performance, the leads, but praised Jameel Khan's performance.

Soundtrack 

The music of film was composed by Rajeev V Bhalla and JAM8 while lyrics written by Rajeev. V. Bhalla, Pallavi Mahajan, Geet Sagar and Shloke Lal.

See also
 Saat phere (seven rounds)
 Saptapadi (seven steps)

Notes

References

External links 
 14 Phere at ZEE5
 

2021 films
Films shot in Mumbai
Indian comedy-drama films
2020s Hindi-language films
2021 comedy-drama films
ZEE5 original films
Films about Indian weddings
Films about social issues in India